A Hand of Glory is the dried and pickled hand of a hanged man, often specified as being the left hand, or, if the person was hanged for murder, the hand that "did the deed."

Old European beliefs attribute great powers to a Hand of Glory combined with a candle made from fat from the corpse of the same malefactor who died on the gallows. The candle so made, lighted, and placed (as if in a candlestick) in the Hand of Glory would have rendered motionless all persons to whom it was presented. The process for preparing the hand and the candle are described in 18th-century documents, with certain steps disputed due to difficulty in properly translating phrases from that era. The concept inspired short stories and poems in the 19th century.

History of the term
Etymologist Walter Skeat reports that, while folklore has long attributed mystical powers to a dead man's hand, the specific phrase Hand of Glory is in fact a folk etymology: it derives from the French , a corruption of mandragore, which is to say mandrake. Skeat writes, "The identification of the hand of glory with the mandrake is clinched by the statement in Cockayne's Leechdoms, i. 245, that the mandrake "shineth by night altogether like a lamp"". Cockayne in turn is quoting Pseudo-Apuleius, in a translation of a Saxon manuscript of his .

Powers attributed

According to old European beliefs, a candle made of the fat from a malefactor who died on the gallows, lighted, and placed (as if in a candlestick) in the Hand of Glory, which comes from the same man as the fat in the candle, would render motionless all persons to whom it was presented. The candle could be put out only with milk. In another version, the hair of the dead man is used as a wick, and the candle would give light only to the holder.

The Hand of Glory also purportedly had the power to unlock any door it came across.

Process

The 1722  describes in detail how to make a Hand of Glory, as cited from him by Émile-Jules Grillot de Givry:

De Givry points out the difficulties with the meaning of the words zimat and ponie, saying it is likely "ponie" means horse-dung. De Givry is expressly using the 1722 edition, where the phrase is, according to John Livingston Lowes "" and de Givry notes that the meaning of "ponie" as "horse dung" is entirely unknown "to us", but that in local Lower Normandy dialect, it has that meaning. His reason for regarding this interpretation as "more than probable" is that horse-dung is "very combustible, when dry".

In the French 1752 edition (called , i.e., "New Edition, corrected and augmented"), however, this reads as "", that is, in Francis Grose's translation from 1787, "sisame of Lapland", or Lapland sesame. This interpretation can be found many places on the Internet, and even in books published at university presses. Two books, one by Cora Daniels, another by Montague Summers, perpetuate the Lapland sesame myth, while being uncertain whether zimat should mean verdigris or the Arabian sulphate of iron.

The  also provides a way to shield a house from the effects of the Hand of Glory:

An actual Hand of Glory is kept at the Whitby Museum in North Yorkshire, England, together with a text published in a book from 1823. In this manuscript text, the way to make the Hand of Glory is as follows:

Cultural references

In comics 
In Hellboy'''s Box Full of Evil story and Being Human story, a Hand of Glory is used to paralyze everyone except the holder of the hand.

In The Invisibles by Grant Morrison large parts of the plot surround attempts from both the Invisibles and the Outer Church to obtain, and find out how to control, a Hand of Glory. In the comic, it is seen as having the propensity to open doors in timespace - i.e. open gates to other worlds and ages.

In Black Magick by Greg Rucka, a hand of glory is crafted from the corpse of a hanged rapist and murderer, Bruce Dunridge. The body was found washed on shore, missing his sinister hand.

In Marvel Comics, the Hand of Glory is a technique used by the Goddess of Death Hela to enhance her strength with mystical energy and kill anybody with her fist.

 In crime 
A Hand of Glory was proposed as one of the motives for an unsolved murder that occurred in wartime England some time in mid-late 1941. The case was made more mysterious by numerous graffiti that appeared later stating "Who put Bella in the Wych Elm?", referring to the woman's corpse which was found inside a tree.

In literature
Severed hands in an occult context occur as early as Herodotus's "Tale of Rhampsinitus" (ii, 121), in which a clever thief leaves a dead hand behind in order to avoid capture. They also appear in early stories of lycanthropy, such as Henry Boguet's  in 1590.

In 1832  wrote the short story "" ("The Hand of Glory, a Macaronic Story"). The same year Aloysius Bertrand published "" ("The Hour of the Sabbat"). Guy de Maupassant made his debut with "" ("The Flayed Hand") (1875) one of his first stories in the  under the pseudonym Joseph Prunier.

The second of the Ingoldsby Legends, "The Hand of Glory, or, The Nurse's Story", describes the making and use of a Hand of Glory. The first lines are:

Now open, lock!
To the Dead Man's knock!
Fly, bolt, and bar, and band!
Nor move, nor swerve,
Joint, muscle, or nerve,
At the spell of the Dead Man's hand!
Sleep, all who sleep! -- Wake, all who wake!
But be as the dead for the Dead Man's sake!

 wrote a poem titled "" ("Studies of Hands") on the subject of the hand of the poet-thief Lacenaire, severed after his execution for a double murder, presumably for future use as a Hand of Glory.

 August W: Derleth's short story "Glory Hand" (Weird Tales, February 1937)
 In "The Eyes Have It", a short story from the Lord Darcy fantasy series, published in 1964, a Hand of Glory is found among the belongings of a nobleman dabbling in black magic.
 In John Bellairs' novel, The House with a Clock in Its Walls, the resurrected witch Selenna Izard uses a hand of glory to paralyze the two good magicians, Jonathan Barnavelt and Florence Zimmermann. It is later implied that the hand may have been that of a hobo named "Hammerhandle", who had disappeared after aiding Selenna Izard in her doomsday scheme.
 In J.K. Rowling's Harry Potter and the Chamber of Secrets, Draco Malfoy sees a Hand of Glory in Borgin and Burkes, a specialist Dark Arts shop. He is told by Mr. Borgin that it "gives light only to the holder". Draco later buys the hand and uses it in Harry Potter and the Half-Blood Prince.
 The Hand of Glory device makes multiple appearances in the Laundry Files series by Charles Stross.
 Multiple Hands of Glory appear in Cassandra Clare's book Lady Midnight, where they are harvested from murderers and used in a dark ritual to raise the main antagonist's true love from the dead.
 A Hand of Glory is mentioned as an item for sale at the floating market in Neil Gaiman's Neverwhere.
 The hand of a man with Dupuytren's contracture is brought aboard ship by the naval surgeon Stephen Maturin in the Patrick O'Brian novel The Hundred Days. The ship's crew assume it's a Hand of Glory and it is thought to bring good fortune to the voyage.
 A Hand of Glory, stolen from the Pannett Park museum, allows the protagonist to search several houses without being witnessed, in The Whitby Witches by Robin Jarvis.
 In Surfeit of Lampreys, the crime novel by Ngaio Marsh, a hand is severed from the dead body of the Marquess of Wutherwood and Rune in an attempt to make a Hand of Glory.
 In "Hand of Glory", a short story by Laird Barron, a hand is taken from a dead body and used to keep the protagonist from moving his body (except his mouth).
A Hand of Glory is depicted on the cover of Middlegame by Seanan McGuire, as well as being frequently mentioned and used throughout the book. It effectively turns the user indetectable, and sometimes turns someone else indetectable. It is used by alchemists, and is the hand of any murdered person dipped in wax with each of the fingers lit.

In music
 "Hand of Glory" is a song by The Smithereens from their album Especially for You.
 The story by Gérard de Nerval was adapted as an opera by Jean Françaix, after a scenario by Vanni-Marcoux; it was premiered at the Bordeaux Festival in 1951.
 Andrew Bird mentions the Hand of Glory in his song "Measuring Cups". He later named an album Hands of Glory.
 The Flesh Eaters reference the concept several times. The cover of their 1981 album A Minute to Pray, a Second to Die appears to depict a Hand of Glory. Their next album, 1982's Forever Came Today, has a song titled "Hand of Glory", and the lyrics of "The Wedding Dice" also include the phrase.
 U.K. noise group Ramleh (band) released an EP in 1983 titled The Hand of Glory. It also features a two-part song of the same name.
Royal Trux released a 2002 album titled Hand Of Glory.
Gorillaz you can see this hand in some videos like the phase 3 announcement or the pink phantom video.

In television
 A Hand of Glory appears in the sixth episode of Supernaturals third season where it is stolen by the thief Bela Talbot, only to find that the Hand is haunted by a vengeful spirit.
 A Hand of Glory was used in the thirteenth episode of The Originals third season by the witch Davina Claire to open a window to the afterlife to communicate with her dead boyfriend.
 A Hand of Glory was also used by the protagonist John Constantine in the third episode of the first season of Constantine. Here, the candle is used to briefly resurrect a dead friend of John's by using a spell and lighting all five fingers. The spell also briefly resurrects every other dead body inside the morgue. The spell lasts as long as the fingers are burning.
 Graceland, season three, episode nine, titled "Hand of Glory", a brief description is given to the origins of a Hand of Glory during a torture scene.
 In The Dresden Files, season one, episode seven, titled "Walls", three college students use a possessed Hand of Glory to commit robberies.
 In Lost Girl, season two, episode seven, titled "Fae Gone Wild", a group of selkies use a Hand of Glory to steal their pelts from a holographic safe.
 In The Chilling Adventures of Sabrina, Part two, episode six, titled "The missionaries", Sabrina uses a hand of glory to gain entrance to the academy of unseen arts.
 In Buffy the Vampire Slayer, season 5 episode 5 former vengeance demon Anya states to Rupert Giles, watcher of the slayer Buffy and the owner of the magic store she helped out that day that a "Hand of Glory packs some serious raw power. Better institute a seven-day background check for-" This is the first episode you see the villain for this season, named "Glorificus", "Glory" for short.

In film
In the film 'A Canterbury Tale(1944) a pub called 'The Hand of Glory' is featured.

 Terror in the Crypt (1964), with candles burning on each fingertip, the hand is used by a witch in an occult ceremony to contact Satan.
 The Skull (1965), there is a hand of glory in Dr. Maitland's study, which is referred to by Anthony Marco.
 In the 1973 film The Wicker Man, the innkeeper tries to put Sergeant Howie to sleep using a Hand of Glory. Its power is such that the innkeeper's daughter expresses concern that "he might sleep for days."
 In the 1987 film Angel Heart Mickey Rourke's character finds a Hand of Glory in Margaret Krusemark's apartment.
 In the 2002 film Harry Potter and the Chamber of Secrets A Hand of Glory appears when Harry Potter finds himself in Knockturn Alley.

In video games
 In the 1998 video game Thief: The Dark Project by Looking Glass Studios, Garrett, the protagonist, searches for his lost Lucky Hand of Glory that he had lent to Issyt the beggar who was caught and thrown into Cragscleft Prison. In mission #2 of that game, Garrett must break his friend Basso the Boxman and his fence Cutty out of the prison, where he also takes the opportunity to find his Lucky Hand of Glory from Issyt's cell.
In the video game series Conquest of Elysium by Illwinter Games, hands of Glory are resources used by players to perform Necromantic rituals
 In the 2016 video game Darkest Dungeon, three "Hand of Glory" provision items are provided in the second quest of the titular Darkest Dungeon, "Lighting the Way". They are described as "The left hand of some malefactor who died on the gallows, made into a candle with the man's own fat." The items are placed on altars called "Iron Crowns" in order to weaken the eldritch horror the player must defeat to beat the game.
 The Hand of Glory is one of the Artifacts that can be obtained with the Archaeology skill in RuneScape.
 In Board Game Online'', the Hand of Glory is one of the Artifacts obtained in the Archaeology Dig Site, where it passively grants Sneaky and Arcane Vision, and can remove fire from the player and root other nearby players.

In podcasts
 In the 2007 podcast series "Wormwood: A Serialized Mystery", the main protagonist Dr. Xander Crowe has replaced his left hand with a Hand of Glory. Among other things it gives him the power to open any lock, and a running gag in the series is that it disassembles his cell phone while he sleeps.
 The horror podcast The NoSleep Podcast features a tale entitled "The Hand of Glory" by author Colin Harker about a drug addict who crafts a hand of glory from the corpse of an erotic asphyxiation victim. There are predictably gruesome consequences.
 The horror podcast Lore (podcast) describes the origins and purpose of the Hand of Glory in episode 113.
 Pastor Drom occasionally makes use of a Hand of Glory when she and Mord go on dangerous outings in The Hidden Almanac. It is implied to be synthetic, or at least that synthetic Hands of Glory are available. Drom's Hand of Glory has a fairly extensive utility, offering a number of powers, spells, and effects depending on the manner and configuration in which the hand is lit, although it's not always 100% reliable and the fingers need twiddling from time to time.

See also
Order of the Occult Hand

References

External links
 The Hand of Glory and other gory legends about human hands – Edited by D. L. Ashliman.

European folklore
Hand
Medieval legends
Magic items
Talismans